Valerie Page may refer to:

Valerie Page, a fictional character in V for Vendetta
Valerie Page, a fictional character in NCIS